Joseph Matthews "Wingy" Manone (February 13, 1900 – July 9, 1982) was an American jazz trumpeter, composer, singer, and bandleader. His recordings included "Tar Paper Stomp", "Nickel in the Slot", "Downright Disgusted Blues", "There'll Come a Time (Wait and See)", and "Tailgate Ramble".

Biography 

Manone (pronounced "ma-KNOWN") was born in New Orleans, Louisiana, United States of Sicilian origin. He lost his right arm in a streetcar accident when he was ten years old, which resulted in his nickname of "Wingy". He used a prosthesis so naturally and unnoticeably that his disability was not apparent to the public.

After playing trumpet and cornet professionally with various bands in his hometown, he began to travel across America in the 1920s, working in Chicago, New York City, Texas, Mobile, Alabama, California, St. Louis, Missouri, and other locations; he continued to travel widely throughout the United States and Canada for decades.

Manone's style was similar to that of fellow New Orleans trumpeter Louis Prima: hot jazz with trumpet leads, punctuated by good-natured spoken patter in a pleasantly gravelly voice. Manone was an esteemed musician who was frequently recruited for recording sessions. He played on some early Benny Goodman records,  for example and fronted various pickup groups under pseudonyms like "The Cellar Boys" and "Barbecue Joe and His Hot Dogs." His hit records included "Tar Paper Stomp" (an original riff composition of 1929, later used as the basis for Glenn Miller's "In the Mood"), and a hot 1934 version of a sweet ballad of the time "The Isle of Capri", which was said to have annoyed the songwriters despite the royalties it earned them.

Manone's group, like other bands, often recorded alternate versions of songs during the same sessions; Manone's vocals would be used for the American, Canadian, and British releases, and strictly instrumental versions would be intended for the international, non-English-speaking markets. Thus, there is more than one version of many Wingy Manone hits. Among his better records are "There'll Come a Time (Wait and See)" (1934, also known as "San Antonio Stomp"), "Send Me" (1936), and the novelty hit "The Broken Record" (1936). He and his band did regular recording and radio work through the 1930s and appeared with Bing Crosby in the 1940 film Rhythm on the River.

His 1939 recording, "Boogie Woogie", featured the piano of Conrad Lanoue, who was part of Manone's band from 1936 to 1940.  In 1943, Manone recorded several tunes as "Wingy Manone and His Cats"; that same year he performed in Soundies movie musicals. One of his Soundies reprised his recent hit, "Rhythm on the River."

Manone's autobiography, Trumpet on the Wing, was published in 1948.

From the 1950s, he was based mostly in California and Las Vegas, Nevada, although he also toured through the United States, Canada, and parts of Europe to appear at jazz festivals. In 1957, he attempted to break into the teenage rock-and-roll market with his version of "Party Doll", the Buddy Knox hit. His version on Decca 30211 made No. 56 on Billboard'''s Pop chart and it received a UK release on Brunswick 05655.

Manone's compositions include "There'll Come a Time (Wait and See)" with Miff Mole (1928), "Tar Paper Stomp" (1930), "Tailgate Ramble" with Johnny Mercer, "Stop the War (The Cats Are Killin' Themselves)" (1941), "Trying to Stop My Crying", "Downright Disgusted Blues" with Bud Freeman, "Swing Out" with Ben Pollack, "Send Me", "Nickel in the Slot" with Irving Mills, "Jumpy Nerves", "Mannone Blues", "Easy Like", "Strange Blues", "Swingin' at the Hickory House", "No Calling Card", "Where's the Waiter?", "Walkin' the Streets (Till My Baby Comes Home)", and "Fare Thee Well (Annabelle)". In 2008, "There'll Come a Time (Wait and See)" was used in the soundtrack to the Academy Award-nominated movie The Curious Case of Benjamin Button.

Manone was survived by his son Joseph Matthew Manone II and grandson Jimmy Manone, who were both musicians, as well as grandsons Joseph Matthew Manone III and Jon Scott (Manone) Harris.

He was featured in Episode 2, "The Gift", in the 2001 documentary  Jazz'' by Ken Burns on PBS on the topic of jazz in the 1920s.

Discography

Selected singles

Other information
For many years Manone's good friend Joe Venuti, the jazz violinist and notorious practical joker, sent Wingy a single cuff link on his birthday.

References

External links
Joseph "Wingy" Manone collection, Institute of Jazz Studies, Rutgers University

 Wingy Manone recordings at the Discography of American Historical Recordings

1900 births
1982 deaths
Jazz musicians from New Orleans
Dixieland singers
Dixieland bandleaders
Dixieland trumpeters
Four Star Records artists
American jazz musicians
20th-century American male singers
20th-century American singers
American amputees
20th-century trumpeters
Amputee musicians